Guulin  (Brass) is a settlement in the northern part of Delger sum (district) of Govi-Altai Province in western Mongolia.

Guulin is an irrigated cropping settlement in semidesert artificial oasis, 27 km N from Delger sum center. It has a school and small hospital. Guulin population is appr.900.

Zavkhan Gol river is about 3 km NW from Guulin, but as river dale is appr.40 m deep,  for the irrigated fields water supply is used 22 km long irrigation channel from upper part of Zavkhan Gol river dale. Irrigated fields are located south from Guulin settlement, the irrigation net covers about 15 km2

References 

Populated places in Mongolia